Part the Second is maudlin of the Well's fourth and most recent album. It was funded by donations from fans, and released for free on the internet in three formats, including a FLAC-encoded 24-bit version. The fans who donated prior to the album's release are credited as executive producers. Donations of any amount continue to be accepted via the band's official website.

In September 2010, the album was released as a limited-edition colored vinyl LP by Antithetic Records, and on CD by Blood Music in 2012.

Track listing

Personnel
 Toby Driver – guitar, baritone guitar, bass guitar, vocals
 Sam Gutterman – drums, bass guitar, other percussion
 Terran Olson – flute, alto and baritone saxophone, piano, organ, synths
 Greg Massi – guitar
 Josh Seipp-Williams – guitar

Guest musicians
 Mia Matsumiya – violin
 David Bodie – orchestral percussion, hand claps
 Madeleine Craw – cello
 Jim Fogarty – "hammond elbow"

References

2009 albums
Albums free for download by copyright owner
Maudlin of the Well albums